Corinth is an unincorporated community in Rutherford County, North Carolina, United States.

References

Unincorporated communities in Rutherford County, North Carolina
Unincorporated communities in North Carolina